The Pikworo Slave camp was founded in 1704 and was active until 1845. It is located in Paga nania, about 3 kilometers west of Paga in the Upper East Region of Ghana. It was originally developed as a slave transit center where slaves were auctioned and later resold in the Salaga Slave market after walking about 150 km to the south. They are later moved to the coast for shipment.

History 
Pikworo slave camp was a slave trading camp where people were sold to English, French and Dutch slave traders.

Special Features 

Eating Bowls Man made scoops in rocks served as eating plates or bowls for slaves at the camp. The larger the size of the scoop the higher the number of slaves to eat from the scoop. 

A gash in a large rock at the camp served as a source of water for cooking.

See also 

 Gambaga Witch camp
 Nzulezo
 Mole National Park

References 

African slave trade
Upper East Region
Tourism in Ghana